The Chinese Elm Ulmus parvifolia 'Prince Richard' is an American cultivar raised by Curtis Wilkins in Texas.

Description
The tree is distinguished by its high density branching and dwarf to semi-dwarf size, attaining a height and spread of 2.1 × 1.5 m at five years, with a stem diameter of 4.4 cm. The dense, deep green, foliage on numerous branches affords the tree a rich, full, and rounded appearance. The small oval leaves, acute at the apex, are alternate, simple, with serrate to crenate margins, 3.0 cm long by 1.8 cm wide.  Growth is slow, averaging 25–31 cm per annum in south-east Texas.

Pests and diseases
'Prince Richard' has shewn no more or less resistance or susceptibility to diseases and pests which normally afflict U. parvifolia cultivars.

Cultivation
'Prince Richard' has been listed on both U S and European Patent Office sites. The plant is easily propagated by softwood cuttings in a 100% pine bark rooting medium.

Accessions
None known.

References

Chinese elm cultivar
Ulmus articles missing images
Ulmus